İlhan Kaynak is a Turkish former footballer who played one game in the Süper Lig with Adanaspor.

Professional career
İlhan made one professional appearance in football with Adanaspor, in a 1-1 Süper Lig tie with İstanbulspor A.Ş. on 28 May 1972.

Personal life
İlhan was born in to a large family of 8 children. His brothers Orhan, Reşit, İrfan, Kayhan and Ayhan were all professional footballers.

References

External links
 

People from Adana
Turkish footballers
Adanaspor footballers
Süper Lig players
Association football forwards
Year of birth missing